The We are Colombia (Somos Colombia) is a liberal political party in Colombia. 
At the last legislative elections, 10 March 2002, the party won as one of the many small parties parliamentary representation. 

Liberal parties in Colombia